Type 96 may refer to:
 Type 96 tank, a main battle tank put into service by the People's Republic of China in 1997
 Type 096 submarine, a new type of submarine under development by the People's Republic of China
 Mitsubishi A5M, the Type 96 carrier-based fighter of the Imperial Japanese Navy
 Mitsubishi G3M, the Type 96 land-based attack aircraft of the Imperial Japanese Navy Air Service
 Howa Type 96, a 40mm automatic grenade launcher used by the JSDF
 Type 96 Armored Personnel Carrier, a wheeled armored personnel carrier used by the JSDF
 Type 96 120 mm self-propelled mortar, a tracked armored mortar carrier used by the JSDF
 Type 96 15 cm howitzer of the Imperial Japanese Army
 Type 96 150 mm Infantry Mortar of the Imperial Japanese Army
 Type 96 AA Gun Prime Mover of the Imperial Japanese Army
 Type 96 light machine gun of the Imperial Japanese Army
 Type 96 mine of the Imperial Japanese Army
 Type 96 25 mm AT/AA Gun of the Imperial Japanese Navy